Kathleen "Kathy" Lewis is an environmental chemist and professor of agricultural chemistry at University of Hertfordshire known for her work on environmental management, especially in the realm of pollution from chemicals.

Education and career 
Lewis earned a Ph.D. from the University of Hertfordshire in 1999. She was awarded the title of Professor in 2014 and, as of 2022, she is a professor at the University of Hertfordshire.

Academic work
Lewis is known for her research in agriculture, especially on the evaluation and management of the environmental impact of agriculture. Her early work developed metrics to quantify the impact of agriculture and pesticides on the environment, and applied these tools to agricultural activities in the United Kingdom. She developed a tool to track agricultural issues known as Environmental Management for Agriculture (EMA), which was distributed on CDs and has been retired. Her subsequent work is as the scientific lead for the on-line Pesticide Properties Database (PPDB). The PPDB provides chemical and environmental information on pesticides and, as of 2011, holds data on over 1800 chemical compounds. In a 2017 expansion of the database, Lewis provided a means to track how pesticides dissipate in the environment.

Selected publications

won the 2013 Outstanding Paper Award Winner at the Literati Network Awards for Excellence.

Awards and honors 
She is a Fellow of the Institution of Analysts and Programmers.

References

External links 

PPDB: Pesticide Properties DataBase

Academics of the University of Hertfordshire
Alumni of the University of Hertfordshire
Living people
Women chemists
Agricultural chemists
Year of birth missing (living people)